Léon Roques (born 24 October 1839 in Aurignac, died 1923) was a French transcriber who is best known for his transcriptions of Claude Debussy and Maurice Ravel. Perhaps his most familiar transcription is for violin and piano of Debussy's piano work La plus que lente.

External links 
 

French composers
French male composers
1839 births
1923 deaths
French male writers